West Haven is a city in New Haven County, Connecticut, United States. It is located on the coast of Long Island Sound. At the 2020 census, the population of the city was 55,584.

History

Settled in 1648, West Haven (then known as West Farms) was a part of the original New Haven Colony. In 1719, it became the separate parish of West Haven, but was still officially a part of New Haven until 1822.

During the American Revolution, West Haven was the frequent launch and arrival point for raiding parties on both sides of the war. On July 5, 1779, the British invaded New Haven Harbor and came ashore in West Haven and East Haven. Thomas Painter, a teenaged militiaman watching for the approaching British ships while standing atop Savin Rock, is depicted on the city seal. The main commercial street, Campbell Avenue, is named for British Adjutant William Campbell, at the time an ensign in the Third Guards, who rescued the Reverend Noah Williston, the local Congregational minister and outspoken revolutionary, from being bayoneted by British and Hessian troopers, after he broke his leg trying to escape his captors. Campbell then ordered the soldiers to help the minister back to the parsonage and had the regimental surgeon set his leg. Campbell is also credited with keeping the troops in reasonably good order during their march through the village and reportedly had two soldiers arrested after a local woman accused them of stealing her jewelry. Campbell was killed hours later atop Allingtown Hill on his way to New Haven by a local farmer-turned defender. Campbell is buried in the Allingtown section of town off Prudden Street. Patriot victims of the invasion are buried in the Christ Church and First Society Cemetery. A historical headstone marks Campbell's approximate gravesite and is maintained by the West Haven Historical Society.

While West Haven again attempted to incorporate as its own town in 1784, that attempt failed, primarily due to the protests of neighboring Milford, which opposed North Milford becoming part of the new town. West Haven and North Milford tried again in 1786 and 1787 with the same result. The two finally joined to become Orange (incorporated as a town in 1822). In 1921, West Haven split from Orange to become a separate town. It was incorporated as a city in 1961 and is known as "Connecticut's Youngest City", although it is also one of the state's oldest settlements.

The Savin Rock section of West Haven was the site of the Savin Rock Amusement Park, which began in the late 19th century as a regionally renowned seaside resort. It evolved into a general amusement park in the 20th century and eventually closed in the 1960s. The park ran along the west side of the New Haven Harbor beachfront.

What followed was a 40 year struggle to stop Savin Rock's Redevelopment—approved by voters in 1963 and officially starting in 1966. It involved multiple referendums, petition drives, court cases, and Connecticut Supreme Court decisions affecting the 40 acre area.  Opposition began about 1971 soon after old Savin Rock had been torn down and the first project built, but ballooned in 1973 when Save Our Shore (SOS) led a referendum to stop “the Great Wall of China”, an 800 foot 12 story apartment, proposed for a 10 acre parcel, blocking the shore view. A 1974 referendum to stop all development was organized by IMPACT (successor to SOS), but was overturned by the Supreme Court in 1978.  This led to a struggle for a Compromise Plan, initiated by Mayor Robert Johnson, and brought to completion by action of the Concerned Citizens for Bradley Point (1979), which petitioned the final holdout to the Plan, to which the Supreme Court had required all developers to agree for any significant change.  The Compromise was signed by all in May, 1979, but IMPACT continued to oppose it thru 1980. Thereafter, a committee sought public input and federal money, and in July, 1984, the 20 acre Bradley Point Veterans Memorial Park opened.  In 1987 and 1989, the city bought development rights of all the remaining parcels, part of which became the Old Grove Park and part included a former restaurant that became the Savin Rock Conference Center.  In 1991, the Land Trust of West Haven, Inc. was founded, but it was not until 2007 that a Conservation Easement was signed, preserving all but the Conference Center, as open space forever—beautiful parks, with walks and bike path, along Connecticut’s longest public shoreline.  Several restaurants remain as last reminders of the area including Jimmies, Turk's of Savin Rock, both for their seafood and split hot dogs and Mike's Apizza & Restaurant.

West Haven has a mayor-council form of government. Nancy R. Rossi, the city's twelfth mayor, was elected in 2017. She is West Haven's first female mayor.  There are two independent fire districts served by the First Fire Taxation (Center) and West Shore. The Allingtown Fire District was relatively recently subsumed by the City who's now responsible for all of its pension-related obligations going forward. Residents expect efforts will be made to consolidate the remaining two fire districts based, in large part, on the recommendation of the State's Municipal Accountability Review Board (MARB) who is currently providing financial support and guidance to the City. As it currently stands, each of the remaining independent Fire Districts levy its own tax rate.

In 1986, West Haven observed the Bicentennial of the United States Constitution. During the year-long celebrations, the mayor and council passed numerous resolutions to encourage community involvement, including naming the official ship of West Haven—the U.S. Navy destroyer USS Edson (DD-946)—and the city's official flower, the daylily. Public schools included curriculum on the Constitution from K–12, and school children were released from class to participate in a Constitution Day parade up Campbell Avenue.

In June 2014, the "Where Angels Play" playground opened next to Sea Bluff Beach in West Haven. The playground was built in honor of Charlotte Bacon, a victim of the Sandy Hook Elementary School shooting. The playground is pink for Charlotte's favorite color and includes some of her drawings.

On the National Register of Historic Places

 American Mills Web Shop, a.k.a.: East Coast Loose Leaf Company, Inc.  114-152 Boston Post Road aka: Orange Ave., West Haven (added to NRHP April 10, 1983)
 Old West Haven High School – 278 Main St. (added November 24, 1985)
 Union School – 174 Center St. (added December 13, 1987)
 Ward-Heitman House – 277 Elm St. (added February 8, 2003)
 West Haven Green Historic District

Geography
West Haven has  of publicly accessible beaches, which is one-quarter of the publicly accessible beaches in Connecticut. The hilly Allingtown district of the city is home to the University of New Haven.

West Haven is located in the south-central portion of Connecticut's 3rd congressional district. The city is bound on the southwest by the Oyster River (the boundary between West Haven and Milford since colonial times), northwest by Orange, north by New Haven and northeast by the West River, which divides West Haven and New Haven. To the east is New Haven Harbor and to the south is Long Island Sound. The Cove River flows through the city.

Principal communities
The three significant neighborhoods in West Haven correspond to the three fire districts. As communities, not all sections of the city fit neatly into these divisions.
Allingtown
West Shore
Center

Additional Neighborhoods:
Sandy Point - adjacent to Sandy Point Beach and Bird Sanctuary

Demographics

As of the census of 2010, there were 55,564 people, 19,886 households. The racial makeup of the city was 63.3% white, 20.6% African American, 0.3% Native American, 4.2% Asian American, 0.0% Pacific Islander, 3.57% from other races and 4.8% from two or more races. 23.2% of the population were Hispanic or Latino of any race.

There were 21,090 households, out of which 28.5% had children under the age of 18 living with them, 41.9% were married couples living together, 15.6% had a female householder with no husband present, and 37.8% were non-families. 31.0% of all households were made up of individuals, and 10.7% had someone living alone who was 65 years of age or older. The average household size was 2.42 and the average family size was 3.06.

In the city, the population was spread out, with 19.7% under the age of 18, 9.7% from 18 to 24, 31.2% from 25 to 44, 21.8% from 45 to 64, and 14.2% who were 65 years of age or older. The median age was 36 years. For every 100 females, there were 91.3 males. For every 100 females age 18 and over, there were 88.2 males.

The median income for a household in the city from 2015-2019 was $62,985 in 2019 dollars. Males had a median income of $38,024 versus $30,610 for females. The per capita income for the city was $21,121. About 6.6% of families and 8.8% of the population were below the poverty line, including 11.8% of those under age 18 and 6.0% of those age 65 or over.

Business
West Haven was a shipping and industrial center, known for its buckle shops and later Armstrong Rubber Co. Coleco (originally Connecticut Leather Company- later the toy & video game manufacturer), and Sikorsky Aircraft, a division of United Technologies, also had operations in West Haven.

Bayer Pharmaceuticals North America, a branch of Bayer AG, based in Leverkusen, North Rhine-Westphalia, Germany, had a plant in West Haven, but the company announced in 2006 that it was shutting its operations in the city, affecting about 1,000 workers. The  former Bayer campus comprises 17 buildings, mostly in West Haven but partly in Orange. In 2007, Yale University purchased the entire campus for biotechnology, pharmaceutical and other life sciences research.

Education
West Haven Board of Education is the local school district.

West Haven is home to the University of New Haven, a U.S. Veterans Affairs hospital, and Yale Field, a baseball park for the Yale University teams and formerly the home field for minor league baseball teams. The Yale Bowl, the home field of the Yale Bulldogs, is in New Haven, near the West Haven border.

Transportation

Interstate 95, Connecticut State Route 34 (also known as Derby Avenue), and U.S. Route 1 (the Boston Post Road) run through West Haven, between Orange and New Haven. Route 162, which both begins and ends at Route 1, starts in Orange, passes through West Haven, and ends in Milford. A north-south state road, Route 122, begins in New Haven, comprising Forest Road, a stretch of Campbell Avenue and First Avenue up to the junction with I-95.

Bus service is provided by Connecticut Transit New Haven. West Haven Center is served by the various 265 and 271 routes (main service along Campbell Avenue). The 265B service continues to Saw Mill Road and Bull Hill Lane; the 265R service run along Jones Hill Road and terminate at the Baybrook Shopping Center near Oyster River; the 265S service continues to Savin Rock via Second Avenue. The Route 271M/S routes run along the West Haven shore towards Milford. The Route 261 route serves the areas along Orange Avenue. The 268 route serves the Veterans Affairs Hospital (C) and Bull Hill Lane (B).

A rail line, used by Metro-North Railroad and Amtrak, runs through West Haven. In 2013, the Connecticut Department of Transportation opened a new Metro-North station in West Haven, across from the former Armstrong factory. West Haven station provides commuter rail service on the Metro-North Railroad's New Haven Line. The station provides full service on Metro-North into New York City, and has 660 parking spaces on-site. Amtrak does not stop in West Haven; the closest Amtrak stop is  New Haven's Union Station.

Tweed New Haven Regional Airport, in New Haven, is the closest facility offering air service to West Haven.

Notable people

 Marian Bergeron, Miss America 1933, youngest holder and only woman from New England to win that pageant's crown title
 Ulish Booker, NFL football player
 Dorinda Keenan Borer, member of the Connecticut House of Representatives
 Art Ceccarelli (1930–2012), Major League Baseball pitcher
 Melanie Chartoff, actress
 Eleanor Estes (1906–1988), author of children's literature
 Douglas Ford (born Fortunato; born 1922), professional golfer
 William L. Hadden, Lieutenant Governor of Connecticut from 1943–1945 and Attorney General from 1945–1951
 Kevin Heffernan, actor, writer, producer, director, and comedian
 Ruth Rosekrans Hoffman (1926–2007) artist and children's book illustrator
 Rob Jackson, former NFL football player
 Jamey Jasta, metalcore musician
George R. Johnson (1929–1973), Pennsylvania State Representative.
 Samuel Johnson (1696–1772), clergyman and the first president of the Anglican King's College (later Columbia University)
 Tommy Nelson, actor
 Rufus Porter (1792–1884), painter, inventor, founder of Scientific American 
 Jon Schnepp, film writer-director 
 Pfc. William A. Soderman (1912–1980), Medal of Honor from World War II
 Tony Sparano (1961–2018), NFL coach
 Jonathan D. Spence, author and professor of history at Yale University
 Ken Strong, NFL football player, inducted into the Pro Football Hall of Fame in 1967
 Donald Thomas, professional football player
 Smoky Joe Wood (1889–1985), Major League Baseball pitcher

References

External links

City of West Haven official website
West Haven Historical Society

 
Cities in Connecticut
Cities in New Haven County, Connecticut
Cities in the New York metropolitan area
Populated coastal places in Connecticut
1921 establishments in Connecticut